The 1868 United Kingdom general election was the first after passage of the Reform Act 1867, which enfranchised many male householders, thus greatly increasing the number of men who could vote in elections in the United Kingdom. It was the first election held in the United Kingdom in which more than a million votes were cast; nearly triple the number of votes were cast compared to the previous election in 1865.

The Liberals, led by William Gladstone, increased their majority over Benjamin Disraeli's Conservatives again to more than 100 seats.

This was the last general election at which all seats were taken by only the two leading parties, although the parties at the time were loose coalitions and party affiliation was not listed on registration papers.

Results

|}

Voting summary

Seats summary

Regional results

Great Britain

England

Scotland

Wales

Ireland

Universities

See also
 List of MPs elected in the 1868 United Kingdom general election

References and further reading

  (covers 1860 to 1890).

External links
 Spartacus: Political Parties and Election Results: 1868 General Election

 
1868 elections in the United Kingdom
General election
1868
November 1868 events
December 1868 events